Mount Pleasant GO Station is a GO Transit railway station Brampton, Ontario, Canada. On the Kitchener line, it serves the Mount Pleasant district of Brampton. It is located at Bovaird Drive and Ashby Field Drive.  As of September 2015, it is the western terminus for most off-peak Kitchener line train services.

History
The station was completed on March 15, 2006, but it opened for service on February 7, 2005 while still under construction because GO Transit needed to alleviate parking shortages at Brampton GO Station, and also needed to serve the nearby community.

Mount Pleasant is wheelchair-accessible with a mini-platform. The parking lot has 1486 spaces and sufficient land to permit future expansion to about 2000 spaces. The station has a nine-bay bus loop serving both GO buses and Brampton Transit on the south side. On the north side, the station had 4 additional bays to service Brampton Transit busses for the new developments in the area.

Bus routes

Bus bay assignments - North Side 

 1 - Brampton Transit Routes: 26 Mount Pleasant
 2 - Brampton Transit Route: 6 James Potter
 3 - Brampton Transit Route: 23 Sandalwood
 4 - Brampton Transit Route: 27 Robert Parkinson & 28 Wanless

Bus bay assignments - South Side 

 5 - Brampton Transit Routes: 55 Elbern Markell & 60 Mississauga Road
 6 - Brampton Transit Route: 9 Vodden
 7 - Brampton Transit Route: 29/29A Williams
 8 - Brampton Transit Route: 4/4A Chinguacousy &  104 Chinguacousy Express
 9 - GO Transit Routes: 31-A,B,E,F, 33-D,E Eastbound
 10 - GO Transit Routes: 31-A,E,F, 33-D,E,F Westbound
 11 - Brampton Transit Routes: 5/5A Bovaird, 505 Züm Bovaird
 12 - Brampton Transit Routes: 1 Queen, 561 Züm Queen West

References

External links

GO Transit railway stations
Railway stations in Brampton
Railway stations in Canada opened in 2005
2005 establishments in Ontario